Pop is a district of Namangan Region in Uzbekistan. The capital lies at the city Pop. Its area is 741 km2. Its population is 222,700 (2021 est.).

The district consists of one city (Pop), 15 urban-type settlements (Oltinkon, Navbahor, Uygʻursoy, Xalqobod, Chorkesar, Uygʻur, Yangi Xoʻjaobod, Sang, Gʻurumsaroy, Qandigʻon, Pungon, Chodak, Madaniyat, Qurgʻonobod, Chorkesar-2) and 10 rural communities.

References 

Districts of Uzbekistan
Namangan Region